Ekowso is a town located in the Kwahu West Municipal District of the Eastern Region of Ghana.

Location 
It is located along the Nkawkaw - New Abirim road.

References 

Populated places in the Eastern Region (Ghana)